The International Nuclear Safety Group, formerly the International Nuclear Safety Advisory Group (INSAG), is an international organization that works to make nuclear safety clear and accessible for all. INSAG was created  by the IAEA in 1985. As part of the IAEA, the INSAG headquarters are located in Vienna. Under the direction of the IAEA, INSAG helps to provide recommendations on nuclear safety approaches, emphasizing the importance of nuclear safety, advising establishments when necessary, and creates new safety plans and procedures to follow.

History 
The IAEA was established in 1957 with the goal of advocating the use of nuclear energy. By 1985 it was recognised that an international group of experts was required to improve nuclear safety.

The first major accident to be investigated was the Chernobyl disaster of April 26, 1986. This resulted in INSAG-1, their first report.
In 2002, the Group's mission was revised and it was renamed the International Nuclear Safety Group, but the acronym INSAG was retained. INSAG's new terms of scope is to "Provide recommendations and opinions on current and emerging nuclear safety issues to the IAEA, the nuclear community and the public."

For a full list of nuclear accidents, see Nuclear and radiation accidents and incidents.

References

See also

INSAG publications

International Atomic Energy Agency